The 1947 Maple Leaf refers to a set of Canadian coins dated 1947 which bear a tiny maple leaf following the date to denote that they were actually minted in 1948.

History 
Prior to 1948, the obverse legend surrounding the bust of George VI on Canadian coins read "GEORGIVS VI D:G:REX ET IND:IMP" ("George VI By the Grace of God, King and Emperor of India").  With India gaining independence from the United Kingdom in 1947, the legend had to be modified for the 1948 coins to remove "ET IND:IMP", and as the Royal Canadian Mint waited for the modified matrices and punches from the Royal Mint in London, demand for new coinage rose.  To satisfy this demand, the RCM struck coins using the 1947 dies with the leaf added to signify the incorrect date.  Normal 1948 coins were minted and issued once the modified matrices and punches arrived.

References 

Maple Leaf, 1947